Joseph Fagin  was a catcher for the St. Louis Browns of the National League in 1895.

External links
 

19th-century baseball players
St. Louis Browns (NL) players
Austin Senators players
Cairo Egyptians players
Baseball players from Cincinnati
Major League Baseball catchers